BK Astrio is a Swedish association football club located in Halmstad, Sweden. As of 2021, the club plays in Division 2.

History

Background
BK Astrio was established on July 30, 1933, by Stig and Orvar Nilsson with Eric Andreasson, Torsten Lasson, and Donald Lasson. The founding members were impressed by the Austrian team Astrio Vienna when they played against Halmstads BK. They thought Astrio was unique and decided to register their team under that name.

The team colors were red shirts with black pants and black socks. The team record for their first year was 5–2–1. The following season they played 33 matches with a 13–7–13 record. The team arranged for games to be played in Onsjö park with much success. By the end of the year, BK Astrio had 29 members. In 1935, the club started a handball division. In 1936, the team changed their colors and began to play with a green jersey and green socks. From 1937–1939, the club did not participate in any games due to World War II. The team resumed play in 1940.  The team played for the first time in Division 2 Halland Halmstadserien Series and won it with 13–3–2 record. In 1941, the team advanced to Division 1 Södra Halland where they stayed until 1943.  The team bounced in and out of Division 1 throughout the 1940s.

On January 20, 1952, introduced Eric Andreasson in a new sports stadium located at Basta Liden later Jutarums IP. In 1953, the club was relegated to Division 3 but was promoted the following year. In 1957, the club was placed seventh in Division 1. On July 18, 1958, the youth division was formed. In 1968, the divisions were renamed and BK Astrio was subsequently placed in Division 5 South Halland. In 1974, the team advanced to Division 4.

In 1980, BK Astrio made it to the Division 3 qualifiers to advance to Division 2. The team met with Vastra Frolunda, Trelleborgs FF and Alvesta and opened at home against Alvesta. Unfortunately, the team lost. During the 1991–1993 seasons, BK Astrio played in Division 2. During this time, the team brought up several talented players such as Mats Jingblad and Erik Wahlstedt who both played Allsvenskan and represented the national team. Other notable players are Stefan Jönsson and Nils Backstrom.

In 1992, the club sold Erik Wahlstedt to IFK Göteborg which helped the financial security of the club. In 2000, a new stadium at Hallägra was constructed. On August 17, 2002, Söndrums IP was opened.

BK Astrio are affiliated to the Hallands Fotbollförbund.

Youth Side
In 2004, the youth side P91 won their division. The following year P91 won again as well as the P93 youth side.  The youth team was successful and in 2006, Per Gulda was selected for the Swedish Under 15 squad. The following year Gulda was picked for the Under 16 team under Abuu Eriksson.

Women's Side
In 1978, BK Astrio added a women's side which has been very successful. Two years later in 1980, they won Division 5 South Halland. The following year, the women were placed fourth in Division 4. In 1982, the women's team won Division 4 Halland. In 1983, they won Division 3. In 1988, the women's team advanced to Division 2 and won the division. In 1989, the team advanced to Division 1 and achieved fifth place. The women's team won Division 1 in 1990. The team played in Division 1 throughout the 1990s. In 1999, the women won Division 1. In 2001, the women were relegated to Division 2, the first time in the club's history. In 2002, the women won Division 2 and were promoted to Söderettan. By 2006, the ladies were playing in Division 3 Halland.

Season to season

Attendances

In recent seasons BK Astrio have had the following average attendances:

Coaches
Source

Chairman
Source

References

External links
 BK Astrio Official Website

Football clubs in Halland County
Sport in Halmstad
Association football clubs established in 1933
1933 establishments in Sweden